HD 182681 (186 G. Sagittarii) is a single, blue-hued star in the zodiac constellation of Sagittarius. It has an apparent visual magnitude of +5.64, which is bright enough to be visible to the naked eye in good conditions. It is moving away from the Sun with a radial velocity of 1.40 km/s.

This is a B-type main sequence star with a stellar classification of B8.5V. The star is about 107 million years old and is spinning rapidly with a projected rotational velocity of 277 km/s.

References

B-type main-sequence stars
Circumstellar disks
Sagittarius (constellation)
Durchmusterung objects
182681
95619
7380